Middelalderparken is a tram stop on the Ekeberg Line of the Oslo Tramway. It is served by lines 13 and 19. It was opened on 4th October, 2020. It is between Bjørvika and Oslo Hospital. It is located at the intersection at Bispegata and Trelastgata. It is located near the former tram stop called 'St Halvards plass'.

References

Oslo Tramway stations